Elections to the Odisha Legislative Assembly were held in March 1995 to elect members of the 147 constituencies in Odisha, India. The Indian National Congress won a majority of seats and Janaki Ballabh Patnaik was appointed as the Chief Minister of Odisha. The number of constituencies was set as 147 by the recommendation of the Delimitation Commission of India.

Result

Elected members

See also
List of constituencies of the Odisha Legislative Assembly
1995 elections in India

References

Odisha
State Assembly elections in Odisha
1990s in Orissa